Geek'd Con is an annual fan convention held in Shreveport, Louisiana. The event was founded in 2015, and debuted as one of the largest Comic book convention in the state of Louisiana, with a first year attendance that topped 12,000 people over three days.

The event showcases comic books, science fiction/fantasy, pop culture and fandom elements, such as horror, anime, manga, animation, toys, collectible card games, video games and web entertainment. Like most comic book conventions, Geek'd Con features a large floorspace, taking up two full floors at the Hilton Hotel Convention Center (Shreveport) for exhibitors. The event includes a large autographs area, as well as an Artists Alley, where comic book artists can sign autographs and sell or do sketches.

Economic impact 

In 2016, Geek'd Con's economic impact for the Shreveport area exceeds $1.4 Million annually. As of the 2019 event, the economic impact grew to $2.2 Million.

Expansions

After the 2015 show in Shreveport, the Geek'd Con brand expanded to new markets. The first expansion was to Tyler, Texas in June 2016, with a second expansion to Rockford, Illinois in October of the same year. While the mild success of this event further expansions have been placed on hold due to low attendance records.

History, locations and dates

References

Anime conventions in the United States
Gaming conventions
Horror conventions
Science fiction conventions in the United States
Multigenre conventions